Metagynella is a genus of mites, placed in its own family, Metagynuridae in the order Mesostigmata.

Species
 Metagynella africana Ryke, 1958
 Metagynella applicata (Vitzthum, 1921)
 Metagynella baloghi Hirschmann, 1975
 Metagynella carpathica (Balogh, 1943)
 Metagynella cubana Wisniewski & Hirschmann, 1993
 Metagynella kargi Hirschmann, 1975
 Metagynella kleinei (Vitzthum, 1921)
 Metagynella kurosai Hiramatsu, 1979
 Metagynella lindquisti Hirschmann, 1979
 Metagynella mexicana Hirschmann, 1979
 Metagynella moseri Hirschmann, 1975
 Metagynella moserisimilis Hiramatsu, 1981
 Metagynella parvula Camin, 1953
 Metagynella vietnamensis Hiramatsu, 1981

References

Mesostigmata